"The Boy Who Ran Away" is the fifth single by Mystery Jets, released in February 2006. The track is featured on their debut album, Making Dens. The single gained them their only appearance on Top of the Pops. It peaked at #23 on the UK Singles Chart.

Track listings

7" vinyl (679L122)
 "The Boy Who Ran Away" – 2:57
 "Sandy Drake" – 3:58

CD (679L122CD)
 "The Boy Who Ran Away" – 2:57
 "Yellow Springs" – 5:59

Limited Edition 7" vinyl (679L115X)
 "The Boy Who Ran Away (Riton re-dub)" – 3:56
 "The Boy Who Ran Away (The Noisettes pic'n'mix lobotomy mix)" – 2:45

External links
 Official website

2006 singles
Mystery Jets songs
2006 songs
679 Artists singles